Fiona Ruth Sampson,  is a British poet and writer.  She is published in thirty-seven languages and has received a 
number of national and international awards for her writing. A former musician, Sampson has written on the links between music and poetry, and her work has been set to music by several composers.  She has received several prizes for her literary biographies and poetry. Notably, Sampson received a MBE for services to literature in 2017.

Education
Sampson was educated at the Royal Academy of Music, and following a brief career as a concert violinist, studied at Oxford University, where she won the Newdigate Prize. She gained a PhD in the philosophy of language from Radboud University Nijmegen in the Netherlands. She now lives in Somerset.

Work
As a young poet she was the founder-director of Poetryfest, the Aberystwyth International Poetry Festival, and the founding editor of Orient Express, a journal of contemporary writing from Europe. She was one of the pioneers of writing in healthcare in the UK, and her early publications are about this work.

Sampson has published twenty-nine books, including poetry, studies of the writing process, writing about place, and literary biography. She is also a broadcaster and critic - she contributes regularly to The Guardian, The Irish Times, The Independent,  The Tablet, the Times Literary Supplement and the Sunday Times. She has a special interest in the Romantics, editing the Faber Poet to Poet edition of Percy Bysshe Shelley, and writing a psychological biography  In Search of Mary Shelley: The Girl Who Wrote Frankenstein. Starlight Wood: Walking Back to the Romantic Countryside is published by Corsair September 1, 2022.

Sampson's work has appeared in thirty-eight languages and received a number of international awards, including the Zlaten Prsten, the Naim Frasheri Laureateship and the European Lyric Atlas Prize. Her own translations include the work of Jaan Kaplinski and Amir Or. She writes on and teaches literary translation. 
Sampson's fifth full poetry collection was Rough Music (Carcanet, 2010).  It followed A Century of Poetry Review (Carcanet, 2009), a PBS Special Commendation,Poetry Writing: The expert guide (Robert Hale, 2009), and Common Prayer (Carcanet, 2007). Some of Sampson's earlier work is held online, in text and audio, at The Poetry Archive.  Her volume of Newcastle/Bloodaxe Poetry Lectures, Music Lessons, was published in 2011, and Percy Bysshe Shelley in the Faber and Faber Poet to Poet series, appeared in the same year (it was the PBS on-line Book Club Choice), reissued in 2012.  Beyond the Lyric: a map of contemporary British poetry (Penguin Random House, 2012) is the first study of the poetry mainstream to identify the range of contemporary British poetics without being partisan, and to recognise the contribution of women and Bame writers across that range. Coleshill (Penguin Random House, 2013), a PBS Recommendation, is a portrait of place and feeling.  Her seventh collection was The Catch (Penguin Random House, 2016) and her eighth, Come Down, Corsair was a Financial Times pick for 2020, Wales Book of the Year (Poetry) and received the European Lyric Atlas Prize and the Naim Frasheri Laureateship.

In 2016 she published a study of such musical forms and poetry, Lyric Cousins: Musical Form in Poetry (Edinburgh University Press, 2016). In 2017 she published a prose exploration of Limestone Country Little Toller, which was a Guardian nature writing book of the year. Sampson's literary biographies have received international critical acclaim. 

In 2020 Omar Sabbagh's Reading Fiona Sampson Anthem Press, an academic monograph on her work, appeared.

Awards and honours
She received an MBE for services to literature in 2017. In the UK, Sampson has received the Newdigate Prize, a Hawthornden Fellowship, a Cholmondeley Award, the Wales Poetry Book of the Year and awards from the Arts Councils of England and of Wales, Society of Authors, Poetry Book Society and the Arts and Humanities Research Council, as well as various national Book of the Year selections, and twice been a finalist for both the T.S. Eliot and Forward Prizes for poetry. She has also been a finalist for three major biography prizes, the UK Biographers’ Club's Best First Biography Prize, the Plutarch Prize and the PEN Jacqueline Bograd Weld Award for Biography 2022. 

In Search of Mary Shelley: the girl who wrote Frankenstein (2018) was a finalist for the Biographers' Club Slightly Foxed prize, a Guardian, Daily Mail, Spectator and Idler Book of the Week, Evening Standard London nonfiction bestseller #4, Sunday Times Must Read, Observer, Independent and Financial Times Pick for 2018, Times and Financial Times Best Summer Read, a The Times, Sunday Times and Mail Paperback choice, The Times Literary Non-fiction Book of the Year. Two-Way Mirror: The life of Elizabeth Barrett Browning (2021) was a finalist for the PEN Jacqueline Bograd Weld Award for Biography and for the Biographers International Organisation Plutarch Prize, a Washington Post Book of the Year, New York Times Review of Books Editors’ choice, Prospect Book of the Year, New Statesman Recommendation, The Tablet Recommendation, Mail Book of the Week, and The Times best paperback of 2022.

Organisational affiliations 
From 2005 to 2012, Sampson was the editor of Poetry Review, the oldest and most widely read poetry journal in the UK. She was the first woman editor of the journal since Muriel Spark (1947–49). In January 2013 she founded Poem, a quarterly international review, published by the University of Roehampton, where Sampson was Professor of Poetry and the Director of Roehampton Poetry Centre 2013–2021. She is currently Emeritus Professor, University of Roehampton. She has been a judge for the Independent Foreign Fiction Prize, the Irish Times IMPAC Awards (now International Dublin Literary Award), the 2011 Forward Poetry Prizes, the 2012 Griffin Poetry Prize, the 2015 T.S. Eliot Prize, and the 2016 Ondaatje Prize.  She chaired the 2015 and 2017 Roehampton Prize and the 2015 and 2016 European Lyric Atlas Prize (in Bosnia).  From 2013 to 2016 she was a judge for the Society of Authors' Cholmondeley Awards. Sampson is a former musician who works frequently with composers, including commissions with Sally Beamish, Stephen Goss and Philip Grange. Her work has been set by composers in Canada, France, Romania and the UK. Sampson is  Fellow of the Royal Society of Literature, where she has served on the Council, and of the English Association and the Wordsworth Trust. She is a Trustee of the Royal Literary Fund.

Selected bibliography
BOOKS (excluding chapbooks):
 Starlight Wood: Walking back to the Romantic countryside, Corsair: September 2022
 Two-Way Mirror: The Life of Elizabeth Barrett Browning, W.W. Norton; Profile Books: 2021
 Come Down, Corsair: 2020
 Macedonian edition, Perun Artis, Skopje: 2022
 Romanian edition, Tracus Arte, Bucharest: 2019 
 Selected Poems as Podrhatavije (European Lyric Atlas Laureate 2020), Povelaj/National Library of Serbia, Kraljevo: 2020 
 as Shpella e Dantes (Naim Frasheri Laureate 2019), Ditet e Naimit, Tetovo: 2020
 Stone Moon, artists' book with Alison Grant: 2020
 In search of Mary Shelley: the girl who wrote Frankenstein, Profile Books: 2018
 Italian edition,DeA Planeta: 2018
 Spanish edition, Galaxia: 2018 
 Limestone Country, Little Toller: May 2017 
 Lyric Cousins: Poetry & musical form, Edinburgh University Press: 2016
 The Catch, Penguin Random House: 2016 
 Serbian edition, Archipelag, Belgrade: 2018
 Russian edition, Liberated Verse, Kyiv: Jan 2017
 Ukrainian edition, Ad Fontes, Kyiv: 2015
 Romanian Edition, Tractus Arte, Bucharest: 2015
 Revenant, in Chinese, Intellectual Property Publishing House: 2014 
 Coleshill, Penguin Random House: 2013
 Bulgarian edition, Small Stations, Sofia: 2019 
 Bosnian edition, Sveti Hieronymous, Banja Luka: 2016
 Night Fugue: Selected Poems, Sheep Meadow Press (US): 2013 
 Beyond the Lyric: a map of contemporary British poetry, Penguin Random House 2012
 Percy Bysshe Shelley, 1st edition: The Romantics Series: Faber: 2011
 2nd edition: Poet to Poet: Faber: 2012
 Music Lessons: The Newcastle Poetry Lectures, Bloodaxe: 2011
 Selected Poems Jaan Kaplinski (co-translator), Bloodaxe: 2011
 Poljupci I Molitva (selected poems), Bronko Miljokovic, Nis: 2010
 Zweimal sieben Gedichte (selected poems), Wieser Verlag, Klagenfurt: 2009
 Pjesme (selected poems), Croatian PEN, Zagreb: 2008
 Rough Music, Carcanet: 2010	
 A Century of Poetry Review (edited and introduced), Carcanet: 2009
 Poetry Writing, Robert Hale: 2009 
 Second impression 2011
 Attitudes of Prayer/Attitudes de Prière (trans into French/Japanese/English) with printmaker Tadashi Mamada, Editions Transignum, Paris: 2008
 Common Prayer, Carcanet: 2007
 On Listening: Selected Essays, Salt: 2007
 Day, Amir Or (translator), Dedalus, Dublin: 2006
 Writing: Self and Reflexivity with Celia Hunt, Palgrave Macmillan: 2005 
 The Distance Between Us, Seren: 2005
 Bulgarian edition, Balkani, Sofia: 2009
 Hebrew edition, Keshev, Tel Aviv: 2007
 Albanian edition, Poeteka, Tirana: 2006
 Macedonian edition, Magor, Skopje: 2005
 Romanian edition, Editura Parallela 45, Bucharest: 2005
 Creative Writing in Health and Social Care (editor), Jessica Kingsley: 2004
 A Fine Line: New Poetry from Central and Eastern Europe (editor with Jean Boase-Beier & Alexandra Buchler), Arc: 2004
 Evening Brings Everything Back, Jaan Kaplinski (translator), Bloodaxe: 2004
 Patuvachki Knevnik (Travel Diary), Knixevna Akademija, Skopje: 2004 
 Folding the Real, Seren: 2001 
 Romanian edition Editura Paralela 45, Bucharest: 2004
 The Healing Word, The Poetry Society: 1999
 The Self on the Page (editor with Celia Hunt), Jessica Kingsley: 1998
 Hebrew edition, ACh Publishers, Tel Aviv: 2002
CDs:
 Fiona Sampson, The Poetry Archive: 2007
 Rough Music, with composer Steven Goss: Boosey and Hawkes: 2010
WORDS FOR MUSIC:
 Bee Sama' with Luminita Spinu: King's College London Festival: 2015
 Three sonnets with Harrison Birtwistle: Nash Ensemble: Wigmore Hall: fc
 Tree Carols with Sally Beamish: Coull Quartet: City of London Festival: 2014, Edition Peters: 2015
 Rough Music with Steven Goss: Guildford International Festival: 2009, Boosey and Hawkes: 2010

References

External links
 
 Poetry Archive profile and poems
 Profile at the British Council
 Poeboes Podcast Interview with Fiona Sampson by André Naffis
 Biography at Carcanet Press
 Video of Sampson "Daydream college for Bards
 

Living people
English women poets
British book editors
Fellows of the Royal Society of Literature
Members of the Order of the British Empire
Fellows of the English Association
Year of birth missing (living people)